Daniel Gerard Purdie (born 20 July 1973) is an Australian politician. He has been the Liberal National Party member for Ninderry in the Queensland Legislative Assembly since 2017.

Following the resignation of Shadow Police Minister Trevor Watts on 28 April 2020, Purdie was made the Shadow Minister for Police.

References

1973 births
Living people
Members of the Queensland Legislative Assembly
Liberal National Party of Queensland politicians
21st-century Australian politicians